Obukhovychi is a village in Vyshhorod Raion, Kyiv Oblast. It belongs to Ivankiv settlement hromada, one of the hromadas of Ukraine.

History
Until 18 July 2020, Obukhovychi belonged to Ivankiv Raion. The raion was abolished that day as part of the administrative reform of Ukraine, which reduced the number of raions of Kyiv Oblast to seven. The area of Ivankiv Raion was merged into Vyshhorod Raion.

2022 war
When the Russian army pulled out of the area near Ivankiv on 1 April, BBC found "clear evidence" of Russian troops using Ukrainian civilians as human shields in Obukhovychi, near Belarusian border. Multiple witnesses report that on 14 March the Russian soldiers went door-to-door, rounded about 150 civilians and locked them up in the local school, where they were used as protection for the Russian forces.

Folk arts
A family of embroiderers and weavers Maria Posobchuk, Hanna Veres, Valentina Veres, Elena Veres worked here.

References

External links
Local personalities

Villages in Vyshhorod Raion